The 26th Annual Nickelodeon Kids' Choice Awards was held on March 23, 2013, at the Galen Center in Los Angeles, California. Actor Josh Duhamel hosted the ceremony. The "Orange Carpet" was set up in front of Galen Center on the sidewalks of Jefferson Boulevard. Voting on the 22 categories began on Thursday, February 14, 2013.

Presenters and performers, and stunts

Host
 Josh Duhamel
 Daniella Monet and cast of Nick Studio 10 (pre-show interstitials)

Musical performers
 Pitbull and Christina Aguilera – "Feel This Moment"
 Kesha – "We R Who We R" / "C'Mon"

Presenters

 Jessica Alba
 Big Time Rush
 Sandra Bullock
 Steve Carell
 Miranda Cosgrove
 Lucas Cruikshank
 Kaley Cuoco
 Gabby Douglas
 Ariana Grande
 Lucy Hale
 Neil Patrick Harris
 Zachary Gordon

 Dwight Howard
 Logan Lerman
 Jennette McCurdy
Cast of See Dad Run
 Cory Monteith
 Kevin Hart
 Jaden Smith
 Ashley Tisdale
 Kristen Wiig

Guest appearances

 Amanda Seyfried
 Josh Hutcherson
 Fergie
 Steven Tyler
 Scott Baio
 Megan Fox
 Jerry Trainor

 Nick Cannon
 Rico Rodriguez
 Darren Criss
 Melissa Benoist
 Mike "The Miz" Mizanin
 Maryse Ouellet
 Dwayne Johnson
 Sophia Grace and Rosie
Mub and Grub from Epic (voiced by Aziz Ansari and Chris O'Dowd)

Winners and nominees
Winners are listed first, in bold. Other nominees are in alphabetical order.

Movies

Television

Music

Sports

Miscellaneous

Events within the show

Slimed Celebrities
In a pre-show promo, Josh Duhamel was slimed while revealing that he was the 2013 Kids' Choice Awards' host. Duhamel was also seen bathing in a bathtub full of slime during the promo. During the show, Josh Hutcherson, Amanda Seyfried, and a group of kids appeared in a special green room to advertise the upcoming movie "Epic". They were slimed by Mub and Grub from the movie.

During the Show:
 Pitbull – During the opening of the show, Pitbull and Christina Aguilera performed "Feel This Moment". Once the performance ended, Pitbull was drenched in a torrent of slime caused by Christina pushing a button. 
 Dwight Howard – Josh Duhamel challenged Dwight Howard to a basketball dunking competition. Duhamel made one dunk and Howard made the other and told him how it was supposed to be done. After Howard's dunk, the basketball hoop rained green slime on the famed basketball star.
 Neil Patrick Harris and Sandra Bullock – During Neil Patrick Harris and Sandra Bullock's presentation, the two stars were covered in green slime while trying figuring out was Harris' special magic wand could do.
 Josh Duhamel and  Nick Cannon – At the end of the show, Duhamel and Cannon took part in a special zip line stunt to reveal the winner of "Best Male Buttkicker". After Dwayne Johnson won the award, he surprised the two stars with a grand finale of green slime all over them and the audience near the stage.

International distribution

Regional awards

Favorite Asian Act (Asia)
Shila Amzah
Han Geng (winner)
Psy
Sarah Geronimo

Favorite Star (Germany/Austria/Switzerland)
Lena Meyer-Landrut
Daniele Negroni
Luca Hänni (winner)
Cro

Favorite Latin Artist (Latin America)
Isabella Castillo (winner, 2nd time in a row)
Eme 15
Martina Stoessel
Danna Paola

Favorite Star (Netherlands/Belgium)
Ferry Doedens
Gers Pardoel (winner)
Britt Dekker
Epke Zonderland

Favorite TV Actress (Argentina) 
 Ale Müller
 Isabella Castillo
 Lali Espósito (winner)
 Lodovica Comello
 Sol Rodríguez
 Martina Stoessel
 Natalia Oreiro
 Thali García

References

http://family-room.ew.com/2013/02/13/kids-choice-awards-2013-tv-nominees-exclusive/
https://web.archive.org/web/20140122184504/http://www.nick.com/kids-choice-awards/all-winners/

External links
 

Nickelodeon Kids' Choice Awards
Kids' Choice Awards
Kids' Choice
Kids' Choice Awards
2013 in Los Angeles
March 2013 events in the United States